United States post office murals are notable examples of New Deal art produced during the years 1934–1943. 

They were commissioned through a competitive process by the United States Department of the Treasury. Some 1,400 murals were created for federal post office buildings in more than 1,300 U.S. cities. Murals still extant are the subject of efforts by the U.S. Postal Service to preserve and protect them.

In 2019, the USPS issued a sheet of 10 Forever stamps commemorating the murals; the murals were from the post offices of Piggott, AR; Anadarko, OK; Florence, CO; Deming, NM; and Rockville, MD.

History

As one of the projects in the New Deal during the Great Depression in the United States, the Public Works of Art Project (1933–1934) was developed to bring artist workers back into the job market and assure the American public that better financial times were on the way. In 1933, nearly $145 million in public funds was appropriated for the construction of federal buildings, such as courthouses, schools, libraries, post offices and other public structures, nationwide. Under the direction of the Public Works of Art Project, the agency oversaw the production of 15,660 works of art by 3,750 artists. These included 700 murals on public display.
With the ending of the Public Works of Art Project in the summer of 1934, it was decided that the success of the program should be extended by founding the Section of Painting and Sculpture (renamed the Section of Fine Arts in 1938) under the U.S. Treasury Department, through Treasury Secretary Morgenthau's executive order of October 14, 1934. The Section of Painting and Sculpture was initiated to commission 1,400 murals in federal post offices buildings in more than 1,300 cities across America.

The Section focused on reaching as many American citizens as possible. Since the local post office seemed to be the most frequented government building by the public, the Section requested that the murals, approximately  oil paintings on canvas, be placed on the walls of the newly constructed post offices exclusively. It was recommended that 1% of the money budgeted for each post office be set aside for the creation of the murals.

The Treasury Relief Art Project (1935–1938), which provided artistic decoration for existing Federal buildings,
produced a smaller number of post office murals. TRAP was established with funds from the Works Progress Administration. The Section supervised the creative output of TRAP, and selected a master artist for each project. Assistants were then chosen by the artist from the rolls of the WPA Federal Art Project.

The Section and the Treasury Relief Art Project were overseen by Edward Bruce, who had directed the Public Works of Art Project. They were commission-driven public work programs that employed artists to beautify American government buildings, strictly on the basis of quality. This contrasts with the work-relief mission of the Federal Art Project (1935–1943) of the Works Progress Administration, the largest of the New Deal art projects. So great was its scope and cultural impact that the term "WPA" is often mistakenly used to describe all New Deal art, including the U.S. post office murals. "New Deal artwork" is a more accurate term to describe the works of art created under the federal art programs of that period.

The murals are the subject of efforts by the U.S. Postal Service to preserve and protect them. This is particularly important and problematical as some of them have disappeared or deteriorated. Some are installed in buildings that are worth far less than the artwork.

Process
Whereas the Public Works of Art Project paid artists hourly wages, the Section of Fine Arts program awarded contracts to artists based on works entered in both regional and national competitions. For this purpose, the country was divided into 16 regions.

Artists submitted sketches anonymously to a committee of their peers for judging. The committees, composed of art critics, fellow artists and architects, selected the finest works. These were then sent, along with the artists' names in sealed envelopes, to the Section of Fine Arts for ultimate selection. This anonymity was to ensure that all competing artists had an equal opportunity of winning a commission. However, many local painters felt they were being kept out of the process, with the majority of contracts going to the better known artists.

Artists were asked to paint in an "American scene" style, depicting ordinary citizens in a realistic manner. Abstract art, modern art, social realism, and allegory were discouraged. Artists were also encouraged to produce works that would be appropriate to the communities where they were to be located and to avoid controversial subjects. Projects were closely scrutinized by the Section for style and content, and artists were paid only after each stage in the creative process was approved.

Controversies
The selection of out-of-state artists sometimes caused controversy, such as stereotypes of rural people being portrayed merely as hicks and hayseeds and not having the murals express their cultural values and work ethics. Many residents of small towns, most notably in the Southern states, resented the portrayal of rural lifestyles by artists who had never visited the areas where their artwork would be displayed.

The controversy was of particularly acute in Arkansas, where 19 post offices received murals, with two post offices, one in Berryville, Carroll County and another in Monticello, Drew County, receiving sculpture. For seven decades following the Civil War, Arkansas had been perceived as the epitome of poverty and illiteracy by the rest of the nation. Many Arkansans had dealt with hardship and tribulation on a daily basis and the coming of the Depression had not made life easier. Although the sketches of such renowned artists as Thomas Hart Benton and Joseph P. Vorst were based on actual events and people encountered during their travels across the state, they sometimes focused on the worst aspects of life in these rural towns.

This was not the legacy that Arkansans wished to leave their children and grandchildren. They wanted the murals to give hope to the younger generation in overcoming adversity, and provide inspiration for a brighter future with better things to come. In some instances, artists were asked to submit multiple drawings before being accepted by the community. When approval was given by the local residents on the artists’ final sketches, work on the murals proceeded, much to the satisfaction of all those involved.

Notable artists

 Ida Abelman
 Kenneth Miller Adams
 Dewey Albinson
 Lee Allen
 Edmund Archer (artist)
 Paul Theodore Arlt
 Victor Arnautoff
 Ernest Hamlin Baker
 Belle Baranceanu
 Edith Barry
 Gifford Beal
 Rainey Bennett
 Lester W. Bentley
 Oscar E. Berninghaus
 Theresa Bernstein
 Auriel Bessemer
 Edward Biberman
 George Biddle
 Henry Billings
 Julien Binford
 Emil Bisttram
 Arnold Blanch
 Lucile Blanch
 Lucienne Bloch
 Acee Blue Eagle
 Peter Blume
 Ernest L. Blumenschein
 Aaron Bohrod
 Louis Bouche
 Ray Boynton
 Edgar Britton
 Manuel Bromberg
 Alexander Brook
 Conrad Buff
 Byron Burford
 Paul Cadmus
 Kenneth Callahan
 Clarence Holbrook Carter
 Daniel Celentano
 Jean Charlot
 Minna Citron
 Frederick Conway
 Howard Cook
 Dean Cornwell
 John Edward Costigan
 Arthur Covey
 Gustaf Dalstrom
 James Daugherty
 Horace Day
 Boris Deutsch
 Maynard Dixon
 Margaret Dobson
 Stevan Dohanos
 Olin Dows
 Ethel Edwards
 Stephen Etnier
 Philip Evergood
 William Dean Fausett
 Paul Faulkner
 Denman Fink
 John Kelly Fitzpatrick
 Joseph Fleck
 Seymour Fogel
 Helen Katharine Forbes
 Frances Foy
 Jared French
 Arnold Friedman
 Lee Gatch
 Robert Franklin Gates
 Arthur Getz
 Paul L. Gill
 Lloyd Lozes Goff
 Anne Goldthwaite
 Xavier Gonzalez
 Bertram Goodman
 Adolph Gottlieb
 Sante Graziani
 Gordon Grant
 Grace Greenwood
 Marion Greenwood
 Davenport Griffen
 William Gropper
 Philip Guston
 Robert Gwathmey
 Richard Haines
 Sally Haley
 Edith Hamlin
 George Matthews Harding
 Charles Russell Hardman
 George Albert Harris
 Abraham Harriton
 Ernest Martin Hennings
 Charles Trumbo Henry
 Natalie Smith Henry
 Victor Higgins
 George Snow Hill
 Stefan Hirsch
 Alexandre Hogue
 Milton Horn
 Victoria Hutson Huntley
 Peter Hurd
 Dahlov Ipcar
 Reva Jackman
 Mitchell Jamieson
 Edwin Boyd Johnson
 J. Theodore Johnson
 Allen Jones
 Joe Jones
 Sheffield Kagy
 Joseph Kaplan
 Charles Kassler
 Rockwell Kent
 Roy King
 Eugene Kingman
 Alison Mason Kingsbury
 Vance Kirkland
 Georgina Klitgaard
 Karl Knaths
 Albert Kotin
 Edward Laning
 Robert Laurent
 Pietro Lazzari
 Thomas C. Lea III
 Doris Lee
 Hilton Leech
 Robert Lepper
 Edmund Lewandowski
 Arthur Lidov
 Abraham Lishinsky
 Elizabeth Lochrie
 Michael Loew
 Frank Long
 Peppino Mangravite
 Ila Mae McAfee
 Ambrose McCarthy
 John McCrady
 Musa McKim
 Miriam McKinnie
 Kindred McLeary
 Ludwig Mactarian
 Ethel Magafan
 Herman Maril
 Reginald Marsh
 David Stone Martin
 Fletcher Martin
 Frank Mechau
 Paul Meltsner
 Ross Moffett
 Stephen Mopope
 F. Luis Mora
 Carl Morris
 Archibald Motley
 Archie Musick
 James Michael Newell
 Dale Nichols
 Emrich Nicholson
 William C. Palmer
 Alzira Peirce
 Waldo Peirce
 Ernest Peixotto
 Guy Pène du Bois
 Bernard Perlin
 Jose Moya del Pino
 Joseph Pollet
 Dorothy Wagner Puccinelli
 J. K. Ralston
 Anton Refregier
 Edna Reindel
 Daniel Rhodes
 Louis Leon Ribak
 George Rickey
 Boardman Robinson
 Paul Herman Rohland
 Louise Emerson Ronnebeck
 Charles Rosen
 Andrée Ruellan
 Olive Rush
 Paul Sample
 Birger Sandzén
 Michael Sarisky
 Suzanne Scheuer
 Martyl Schweig
 Elise Seeds
 Ben Shahn
 Bernarda Bryson Shahn
 Henrietta Shore
 Mitchell Siporin
 John French Sloan
 Jacob Getlar Smith
 William Sommer
 Moses Soyer
 Raphael Soyer
 Ethel Spears
 Francis C. Speight

 Niles Spencer
 Harry Sternberg
 Ray Strong
 Agnes Tait
 Lorin Thompson
 Edward Buk Ulreich
 Stuyvesant Van Veen
 Philip von Saltza
 James Watrous
 Elof Wedin
 W. Richard West, Sr.
 Jessie Wilber
 Lucia Wiley
 Lumen Martin Winter
 Bernard Zakheim
 Marguerite Zorach
 Milford Zornes
 Jirayr Zorthian

48-State Mural Competition
A competition for one mural to be painted in a post office in each of the 48 states (plus Washington, D.C.) was held in November 1939 at the Corcoran Gallery. The jury selecting the winners was composed of four artists: Maurice Sterne (Chairman), Henry Varnum Poor, Edgar Miller, and Olin Dows. Winners were chosen from the original mural studies, not completed murals; community response to artist proposals sometimes resulted in revised designs.

See also
 List of United States post office murals
 List of New Deal murals

Notes

References

Further reading

Harris, Jonathon. Federal Art and National Culture: The Politics of Identity in New Deal America. Cambridge: Cambridge University Press, 1995.

Parisi, Philip. The Texas Post Office Murals: Art for the People. College Station, Texas: Texas A&M University Press, 2004.
Smith, Bradley. The USA: A History in Art. Garden City, New York: Doubleday & Company, 1975.
Gibson, Lisanne. Managing the People: Art Programs in the American Depression. Queensland, Australia: Journal The Journal of Arts Management, Law, and Society, 2002.
Marling, Karal Ann. Wall to Wall America: Post Office Murals in the Great Depression. Minneapolis: University of Minnesota Press, 1982.
Park, Marlene and Gerald E. Markowitz. Democratic Vistas: Post Offices and Public Art in the New Deal. Philadelphia:  Temple University Press, 1984.
Jones, Todd. “Mistaken Murals: The Neglected Story of the Nutmeg State’s New Deal Post Office Art.” Connecticut History Review 59, no. 1 (spring 2020): 40–79.

External links 
Historian, United States Postal Service. New Deal Art in Post Offices (September 2015)
David Lembeck, Rediscovering the People's Art, New Deal Murals in Pennsylvania Post Offices, with photographs by Michael Mutmansky, (2008)
National Register of Historic Places, Cross County, Arkansas (2009)
National Register of Historic Places, Randolph County, Arkansas (2009)
The History of United States Post Office Murals (2018)

Murals in the United States
Public art in the United States
United States Postal Service
Section of Painting and Sculpture
Treasury Relief Art Project
Postal history of the United States